Klinggräff is a surname. Notable people with the surname include:

 Carl Julius Meyer von Klinggräff (1809–1879, C.Klinggr.), German botanist
 Hugo Erich Meyer von Klinggräff (1820–1902, H.Klinggr.), German botanist